Druzhba is a rural locality (a settlement) in Valuysky District, Belgorod Oblast, Russia. The population was 278 as of 2010. There are 2 streets.

Geography 
Druzhba is located 6 km south of Valuyki (the district's administrative centre) by road. Valuyki is the nearest rural locality.

References 

Rural localities in Valuysky District